Greg Williams (born March 12, 1976) is an American football coach who is the passing game coordinator for the Green Bay Packers of the National Football League (NFL). He previously served as an assistant coach for the Denver Broncos, Indianapolis Colts and San Diego Chargers.

Williams has 15 seasons of coaching experience, including nine years at the NFL level.

Playing career
Williams is a former wide receiver and safety that played at the University of North Carolina. He competed in training camps with the Chicago Bears and New York Giants before spending time in NFL Europe, the XFL and the Arena Football League. Williams played defensive back for the Indiana Firebirds in the Arena Football League from (–), as well as the Chicago Rush from (–).

Coaching career

College
Williams' coaching career began as an intern with Arizona State University in 2003 and as an assistant coach at the College of DuPage from 2004 to 2005. Williams spent two years (2006–2007) as Arkansas Tech University's defensive backs coach and recruiting coordinator before working the 2008 season as the University of Pittsburgh's secondary coach and graduate assistant.

NFL

San Diego Chargers
In 2009, Williams was hired by the San Diego Chargers as their assistant linebackers coach. He held that position for four seasons before shifting to the team's assistant secondary coach from 2013 to 2015.

Indianapolis Colts
In 2016, Williams was hired by the Indianapolis Colts as their defensive backs coach under head coach Chuck Pagano.

Denver Broncos
In 2018, Williams was hired by the Denver Broncos as their defensive backs coach under head coach Vance Joseph.

Arizona Cardinals
On February 6, 2019, Williams was hired by the Arizona Cardinals as their cornerbacks coach under defensive coordinator Vance Joseph and head coach Kliff Kingsbury.

Green Bay Packers
On March 10, 2023, Williams was hired by the Green Bay Packers as their passing game coordinator.

References

1976 births
Living people
American football defensive backs
American football wide receivers
Arizona Cardinals coaches
Arizona State Sun Devils football coaches
Arkansas Tech Wonder Boys football coaches
Chicago Rush players
Denver Broncos coaches
Indiana Firebirds players
Indianapolis Colts coaches
North Carolina Tar Heels football players
Pittsburgh Panthers football coaches
San Diego Chargers coaches
San Francisco Demons players
Junior college football coaches in the United States

External links
 Green Bay Packers bio